Milagros Ayelén Otazú (born 31 May 2001) is an Argentine footballer who plays as a left back for UAI Urquiza and the Argentina women's national team.

International career
Otazú made her senior debut for Argentina during the 2018 Copa América Femenina on 10 April that year in a 6–3 victory over Ecuador.

References

2001 births
Living people
People from Posadas, Misiones
Argentine women's footballers
Women's association football fullbacks
UAI Urquiza (women) players
Argentina women's international footballers
Sportspeople from Misiones Province